Dialeuca is a genus of gastropods belonging to the family Cepolidae. 

The species of this genus are found in Central America.

Species:
 Dialeuca blandiana (C. B. Adams, 1850)
 Dialeuca conspersula (L. Pfeiffer, 1846)
 Dialeuca nemoraloides (Adams, 1845) 
 Dialeuca subconica (C. B. Adams, 1845)

References

 Bank, R. A. (2017). Classification of the Recent terrestrial Gastropoda of the World. Last update: July 16th, 2017.

External links
 Albers, J. C. (1850). Die Heliceen nach natürlicher Verwandtschaft systematisch geordnet. Berlin: Enslin. 262 pp

Cepolidae (gastropods)
Gastropod genera